Tamás Szabó may refer to:

 Tamás Szabó (bishop) (born 1956), Hungarian Roman Catholic bishop
 Tamás Szabó (politician) (born 1957), Hungarian physician and politician
 Tamás Szabó (musician) (born 1984), Hungarian musician